Veseto and the black and white happiness is a 2009 short film produced by Annie Apostolova and directed by Ivaylo Brusovski.

Plot
Veselina Gospodinova is a Bulgarian actress. She plays a confused and depressed girl in this short film. She expected to receive a TV but finally she got the " Black and white happiness "...

Cast
Veselina Gospodinova

Production

Bruce Pictures Studios Co.

Release
The short film premiered at 5 November 2009.

References
1. Veseto and the black and white happiness at Facebook
2. Bruce Pictures Studios
3. The Film in Tweeter

2009 short films
2009 films
2000s Bulgarian-language films
Bulgarian short films